Nicholas Douglas McArthur (born 21 December 2001) is a Guyanese professional footballer who plays as a right midfielder for National Premier League club Portmore United and the Guyana national team.

Club career 
In June 2021, McArthur signed for Jamaican club Portmore United. He signed a two-year contract with the club.

International career 
McArthur made his debut for the Guyana national team in a 4–2 win over Aruba in the CONCACAF Nations League B on 15 November 2019.

Honours 
Fruta Conquerors
 GFF Elite League: 2017–18, 2019

References

External links
 
 

Living people
2001 births
Guyanese footballers
Sportspeople from Georgetown, Guyana
Guyana international footballers
Guyana under-20 international footballers
Association football midfielders
Fruta Conquerors FC players
Portmore United F.C. players
Guyanese expatriate footballers
Expatriate footballers in Jamaica
Guyanese expatriate sportspeople in Jamaica